Tootu Madike is an 2022 Indian Kannada language comedy suspense film directed by Chandra Keerthi and produced under Sarvata Cine Garage and Giri Basava Productions in association with SpreadOn Studio. It stars Pramod Shetty, Chandra Keerthi, and Paavana. Apart from directing and acting in the film Chandra Keerthi wrote the script and the story of the film. The dialogues are written by Raghu Niduvalli. The cinematography and music handled by Naveen Challa and Swamynathan RK respectively.

Pre-production began in March 2019. Principal photography of the film began in August 2019 and the film is shot entirely in Bangalore, Karnataka. The first look poster of the film was unveiled by Dr.Shivarajkumar on 9 December 2019. All production and post production work are completed as of 2020. Due to COVID-19 pandemic the film's release has been postponed. The film released on 8 July 2022.

Cast 
 Pramod Shetty as Anantu
 Chandra Keerthi as Nasgunni
 Paavana Gowda as Parimala
 Girish Shivanna as Dollar
 Uggram Manju as Tom
 Shankar Ashwath as Ramdas
 Nanda Gopal as Kannan
 Arun Murthy as Papanna
 Sitara as Premakka
 Raghavendra N as Nagaraju
 Naresh Bhat as Rakesh

Soundtrack 
Swamynathan RK has been signed to compose the songs and score for the film. The songs are written by Chethan Kumar of Bharaate fame, Nithin Narayan and others. The choreography of the songs are done by Mohan Master. Vijay Prakash and Chethan Naik has lend his voice for a song in the film and guitars are recorded by Keba Jeremiah.

References

External links

2022 films